Ingushes in Turkey — is an Ingush diaspora of about 85 thousand people.

General information 
The Ingush, who emigrated to Turkey at various times and represent the current Ingush diaspora, have gone through a long process of integration into Turkish society. They are full citizens and are involved in the cultural and political life of the Turkish state. Absolutely everyone speaks Turkish. At the same time, the spiritual and cultural connection with Ingushetia has not been lost. The Ingush language is mainly spoken only by representatives of the older generation, however, attempts are being made to implement a program to increase the level of knowledge of the Ingush language among young people as well. The Ingush in Turkey honor and practice Ingush customs and traditions. Whenever possible, they try to marry representatives of the Ingush diaspora in Turkey and the countries of the Middle East, as well as other Caucasian diasporas. Many descendants of the Ingush muhajirs who moved to Turkey in the 19th century keep elements of the Ingush national dress and household items. Currently, the Ingush Cultural Center and the Ethnographic Museum are functioning, which presents various monuments (elements) of Ingush culture and history.

History 
The Ingush diaspora in Turkey and the countries of the Middle East is unique in that it moved to the Ottoman Empire not only in the 60s of the XIX century, but also in large groups in subsequent years, especially during the reign of Alexander III. Despite the difficulties of emigration, unlike other peoples, the Ingush enjoyed the proximity of the transport artery - the Georgian Military Road and the Darial Gorge, which made it possible to resettle in Turkey without problems. According to the Turkologist researcher Marem Yalkharoyeva, very large groups of Ingush emigrated to Porto in 1865, 1877, 1878, 1886, 1887, 1892, 1895, 1900, 1902, 1904, 1905, 1912. 329 families or about 2000 Ingush from 15 Ingush villages emigrated in 1904.

After the Caucasian War in 1865, part of the Ingush migrated (Muhajirism) to the Ottoman Empire. In total, 1454 families moved out of Ingushetia, in particular from two communities (Karabulak and Nazranovsky sections of the Ingush district) (including Karabulaks - 1366 families and Nazranians - 88 families) (according to other sources - up to 1500 families of Karabulaks and 100 families Nazranites). The descendants of those settlers form the Ingush diasporas in Turkey, Jordan and Syria. In these countries, many Ingush were recorded under the ethnonym Circassians.

The first scientific and ethnographic studies of the Ingush diaspora in Turkey and the countries of the Middle East were carried out in the 1990s by the Ingush philologist, Turkologist and journalist M. A. Yalkharoeva.

In 2014, the "Days of Culture of the Republic of Ingushetia in the Republic of Turkey" were held in Turkey. Representatives of the Consulate General of the Russian Federation in Istanbul, the Government of the Republic of Ingushetia and the Ingush diaspora in Turkey took part in the joint Ingush-Turkish cultural project. In 2017, with the participation of the Ingush diaspora, Turkey and Ingushetia signed a number of agreements on economic cooperation.

Diaspora representatives 
Salih Polatkan (Khamatkhanov) - army general, military attache in Yugoslavia (1950-1952);
Salim Polotkan (Khamatkhanov) - Turkish officer, athlete, champion of Central Europe, participant in the 1936 Summer Olympics in Berlin;
Suleiman Sirr Koydemir (Beshtoev) - Turkish statesman, first mayor of Beysehir;
Hasan-Basri Gekkaya (Bekov) - Turkish journalist, editor-in-chief of the Meram newspaper;
Ekrem Gekkaya (Bekov) - Turkish film actor;
Maksharif Beshtav (Akhriev) - Doctor of Historical Sciences;
Atila Tachoi (Tochiev) - Doctor of Medical Sciences;
Ferdi Aydamir (Tumgoev) is a Turkish writer.
Mekki Sharif Bashtav (tur. Mekki Sherif Bashtav, Ingush. Beshtoy Maksherif) (born 1913, in Beyshehir, Konya province, Turkey - died in 2010, Turkey) - Ingush and Turkish writer, medieval historian and Turkologist.
As well as a number of representatives of the Ingush diaspora who became heroes of Turkey and were awarded the Turkish Istiklal Medal (“Medal of Independence” or “Medal of Freedom”, tour. İstiklal Madalyası), including Mehmet Ketey (Magomed Kotiev), Abdul-Mezhid Koydemir (Beshtoev), Ismail Tashkoy (Torshkhoev) and others. One of those presented for the award, Osman Timurziev, refused the medal due to the difficult economic situation in Turkey (the medal was made of pure gold).

See also 
Ingush diaspora
Ingushes in Europe
Ingushes in Syria
Ingushes in Jordan

References

Bibliography 
 
 
 
 

Turkey
Ethnic groups in Turkey